In a Glass House is the fifth album by British progressive rock band Gentle Giant, released on 21 September 1973. The album is a loosely-realized concept project based on the aphorism "Those who live in glass houses shouldn't throw stones". The record begins and ends with the sound of breaking glass. It is the first album released by the band following the departure of Phil Shulman.

Release

This was because their US label Columbia Records rejected the album as uncommercial. As a result, Columbia dropped the band from the label which contractually allowed the band to take ownership of the original master recording and all rights to it. This cleared the way for the first "official" release of the title in the United States on compact disc on the band's own Alucard label.

The 2004 release had two live recordings from the tour as bonus tracks. The album was reissued in 2005 and distributed by Derek Shulman's DRT label with 1 bonus live track as part of the 35th Anniversary reissue series of the band's back catalogue. In 2009, In a Glass House became available for the first time as a digital download with bonus live recordings (these recordings differed from the original 2004 and 2005 release of the album) remastered by Fred Kervorkian under the supervision of Ray Shulman. In a Glass House received a physical release on CD as part of a 40th Anniversary series of reissues this time without any bonus tracks with plans to release vinyl versions of all the band's albums from In a Glass House through Giant for a Day in late 2010.

The final track of the album is hidden. Following the song "In a Glass House", there is a delay then a brief recapitulation of every other track on the album. The song is named "Index" in LP releases but not marked in the cover of the CD releases. The album cover had a black and white lithograph of the group covered with clear plastic ("glass") on a die-cut.

Track listing
All lead vocals by Derek Shulman and Kerry Minnear, except "A Reunion", sung by Kerry Minnear.

35th anniversary disc contains only "The Runaway/Experience" bonus track with a length of 9:43

Personnel

Musicians
Gary Green – 6 string electric guitar (1, 3, 4, 5, 6), 12 string acoustic guitar (1, 6), 12 string electric guitar (4), steel guitar (6), mandolin (6), tambourine (6), treble recorder (3)
Kerry Minnear – Moog (1, 3, 6), Hammond organ (1, 3, 4, 6), piano (3, 4), Baldwin Electric Harpsichord (1, 3), electric piano (1, 5, 6), Thomas Organ (3, 4), clavichord (4), RMI 368 Electra-Piano and Harpsichord (4,6), celesta (2), glockenspiel (2,4), marimba (1,2), vibraphone (2), tympani (2), cello (5), descant recorder (1, 3), co-lead vocals (1, 3, 4, 6), lead vocals (5)
Derek Shulman – lead vocals (1-4, 6), alto saxophone and soprano saxophones (6), descant recorder (1)
Ray Shulman – bass guitar (1, 3-6), acoustic guitar (6), violin (3-6), tambourine (4), backing vocals (1, 6)
John Weathers – drums (1, 3, 4, 6), bass drum (5), cowbell (6)

Production
Arranged By Gentle Giant
Produced By Gentle Giant & Gary Martin
Recorded & Engineered By Gary Martin
Mixed By Dan Bornemark

Notes

References

1973 albums
Concept albums
Gentle Giant albums
Vertigo Records albums